The Tabon Caves, dubbed as the Philippines' Cradle of Civilization, are a group of caves located on Lipuun Point, north of Quezon municipality, in the south western part of the province of Palawan on Palawan Island, in the Philippines. They are part of the Lipuun Point Reservation, which has been protected by the government of the Philippines as a museum reservation to protect the caves and immediate vicinity from deforestation and to preserve the cultural artifacts present there.

The caves are named after the Tabon scrubfowl. It is bordered on the south by the town proper of Quezon, Panitian on the west, and the South China Sea on the north and east. Out of 215 known caves, 29 have been explored and seven  of these are open to the public. The seven  include Tabon, Diwata, Igang and Liyang Caves. One of the oldest human bones found in the Philippines, the Tabon Man,  was found here in 1962. Other excavated, unexamined remains are stored onsite. In 2006, the Tabon Cave Complex and all of Lipuun was added to the tentative list of the Philippines for future UNESCO World Heritage Site nomination.

The complex is managed by the National Museum and was declared as a National Cultural Treasure by the same institution in February 2011.

Archaeological discoveries 

The caves were researched by Dr. Robert B. Fox and a team from the National Museum of the Philippines between 1962 and 1966. The greatest find of was the skull cap of the Tabon Man.  It is believed to be approximately 22,000-24,000 years old. The team found over 1,500 burial jars.  One jar in particular, the Manunggul Jar, is considered to be a National Cultural Treasure. Other finds included earthenware, jade ornaments and jewelry, many stone tools, animal bones, and human fossils dating back to 47,000 years ago, the earliest human remains found in the Philippines. The archaeological finds indicate habitation from 50,000 to 700 years ago.  The limestone formations in the reservation date back 25 million years to the Lower Middle Miocene Period.

The Lipuun Point Reservation, covering a  island connected to the Palawan mainland by a mangrove forest, was declared a Site Museum Reservation in April 1972 and was made a priority site for tourism development in 1991 for its natural and cultural heritage.

In recent years, verification of facts in addition to further analysis of previously collected samples has allowed for a greater understanding of the site as a whole. Radioisotope dating techniques have been able to show a period of near continuous habitation from 30,000 to 9,000 years ago. Human remains as well as rock flakes, hammers, and other stone tools indicate the cave may have been used as a workshop. The bone fragments found in the caves have been suggested to have been from the late Pleistocene to early Holocene periods. Previous excavations of the site have also revealed evidence of a diet including pig and deer, which are extinct in the Philippines today.

While little new data is available because of the cave's location and safety concerns, they are slowly being excavated and the old data is being reexamined.  Approximately 25% of archaeological sites in the caves have been excavated.

Cave use 
Earliest cave uses included inhabitation, and the factory like production of stone tools. According to a video by Dr. Fox, a jar burial period began 3000 years ago and lasted until 1500 years ago. This is evidence the area became dominated by people known as the Sa Huỳnh culture.

The Sa Huynh adorned their dead with agate, carnelian, and glass beads from India and Iran. Artifacts of this nature, including glass bracelets, were found in the cave and are displayed at the Palawan Cultural Museum in Puerto Princesa.

A migration of Sa Huyhn people to Vietnam is accepted by most experts to have been the forebears of the Cham people. These are a people still existing today that created an empire known as Champa.

History of the people in the area took on a new significance in modern times owing to the Spratly Islands dispute.

Igang Cave findings
Igang is one of the upper caves and one of the longest of the complex.  It appears to have been the primary burial site and most of the burial jars were found here.

Tabon Cave wall findings
Tabon Cave lends its name to the complex as a whole. In this large cave with a big open chamber, researchers found artifacts indicating trade with China during the Song dynasty and the Yuan dynasty. These are now at the Philippine National Museum in Manila.

College of Tabonology
In July 2015, Holy Trinity University in Puerto Princesa, Palawan was selected for the construction of a new college to studies of ancient Palawan man (Tabonology).
Nearly all active research stopped after Dr. Robert B. Fox died.

Security measures
The National Museum of the Philippines carefully guards the cave complex.  All visitors are watched to ensure they take nothing but pictures and do not damage the cave walls.  Further, all burial jars and remains have been secured.

One issue is that new research and exploration of the complex has largely ceased.

Gallery

References

External links

 Tabon Cave Story Video of caves.
 National Museum of the Philippines Anthropology Section.
 Arts of the Philippines Article on the Manunggul Jar

Caves of the Philippines
Landforms of Palawan
Prehistory of the Philippines
Archaeology of the Philippines
Archaeological sites in the Philippines
Hinduism in the Philippines
Tourist attractions in Palawan
World Heritage Tentative List for the Philippines